Pellicier is a surname. Notable people with the surname include:

Alexandre Pellicier (born 1981), French ski mountaineer
Guillaume Pellicier (aka Pellissier,  1490–1568), French prelate and diplomat
Osmaidel Pellicier (born 1992), Cuban sprinter

See also
Pellicer